The Mexican Border Service Medal was a U.S. service medal established by an Act of Congress on July 9, 1918. It was awarded for service between May 9, 1916 and March 24, 1917, or with the Mexican Border Patrol between January 1, 1916 to April 6, 1917. 

The medal recognizes those military service members who were assigned to the U.S.-Mexico border at the period of time when the United States was on the verge of all-out war with Mexico. The United States was then engaged in the Pancho Villa Expedition, a military operation conducted by the United States Army against the paramilitary forces of Mexican  revolutionary Francisco "Pancho" Villa from March 14, 1916, to February 7, 1917, during the Mexican Revolution 1910–1920. 

The U.S.-Mexico border was thought to be a potential location for a German-funded invasion by Mexico. Border service went into effect when this possible threat was exposed with the British interception of the Zimmerman Telegram, which discussed Germany's proposal that Mexico join in an alliance with Germany if the U.S. were to enter the war (World War I); in January 1917, the telegram was intercepted and deciphered by British Intelligence and its contents were made public by the United States on March 1 (the U.S. declared war on Germany, April 6, 1917).

To be awarded the Mexican Border Service Medal, a service member must have served with the United States Army, along the Mexican border, or must have been assigned as a Regular or National Guard member to the Mexican Border Patrol.  Those who had received the Mexican Service Medal were not eligible for the Mexican Border Service Medal. The United States National Guard was sent to guard the American side of the border as regular Army personnel were being depleted by the efforts in Mexico.

The Mexican Border Service Medal held dual status as both a U.S. Federal and National Guard medal. The first recipient was Major General Charles M. Clement, in recognition of his status as the longest-tenured National Guard officer eligible for the award at the time it was authorized.

Congress created a similar award to present to members of the Texas National Guard who served on the border from December 8, 1917 to November 11, 1918, known as the Texas Cavalry Medal. These guardsmen deployed to the border to free up regular Army units for service during World War I.

See also
Awards and decorations of the United States military

References

External links
 

1918 establishments in the United States
Awards established in 1918
United States service medals